Noanamá is a village in Medio San Juan Municipality, Chocó Department in Colombia.

History
Noanamá's population was estimated at 300 in 1957.

The village was occupied by National Liberation Army militants in early 2018.

Geography
Noanamá is situated in the Colombian rainforest, on the bank of a river. The main resources in Noanamá are gold, coca and an indigenous pancoger, as the local river is too polluted to fish or log timber. Sugarcane was grown in the area in the early 20th century.

Climate
Noanamá has a very wet tropical rainforest climate (Af).

References

Populated places in the Chocó Department